Reverb is a weekly HBO music television series spotlighting emerging talent that ran for four seasons (1997–2001). Reverb captured the energy and spontaneity of live music by taking viewers on stage, backstage, and into the audience at some of the premier venues in the United States. Joining artists on tour, without special staging or second takes, Reverb created an unfiltered, authentic and intimate experience where the viewer became part of the live show dynamic between artist and fan. During its run, the show became the highest-rated, regularly scheduled music program on television. A joint effort of HBO and Warner Music Group, Reverb featured a wide variety of artists from major and independent record labels. Vanity Fair magazine called the show "a brilliant showcase of underground favorites."

The series creators were Jim Noonan, Chris Spencer and Will Tanous. Noonan served as Executive Producer (Season 1–3) and Tanous served as a Producer (Seasons 1-3) and Executive Producer (Season 4). Directors for the series included Milton Lage and Linda Mendoza.  Respected music producer and engineer, Mr. Colson of Smart Studios in Madison, Wisconsin served as the series' primary music mixer.  Reverb was also critical in the launch of the career of comedian Fred Armisen, who was featured as a special correspondent. Comedian and musician Dave Hill served as a writer on the show.  He also composed and performed the show's theme song.

Artists featured
Artists performances featured on Reverb included the following: 

Adema
Archers of Loaf
Bad Religion
Beastie Boys
Beck
Ben Folds Five
Beth Hart
Bettie Serveert
Blondie
Björk
Built to Spill
R. L. Burnside
Calexico
Tracy Chapman
Cheap Trick
Cibo Matto
Paula Cole
Collective Soul
Cornelius
Cornershop
Creeper Lagoon
The Cult
Dinosaur Jr.
Disturbed
Pete Droge
Eels
Everclear
Everlast
Failure
Fastball
The Flaming Lips
Foo Fighters
Fountains of Wayne
G. Love & Special Sauce
Goldfinger
Grant Lee Buffalo
Green Day
Guided by Voices
Ben Harper
Robyn Hitchcock
Hole
Imperial Teen
Kid Rock
The Lemonheads
Linkin Park
Live
The Living End
Lotion
Marvelous 3
Melvins
The Mighty Mighty Bosstones
Moby
Morphine
Mos Def
Mudvayne
Oasis
Oysterhead
Onesidezero
Owsley
Papa Roach
Pavement
Pennywise
Pete Yorn
pete.
Primus
Rage Against the Machine
Remy Zero
Reverend Horton Heat
Rocket from the Crypt
The Roots
Sebadoh
Shootyz Groove
Semisonic
Showoff
Smash Mouth
Smoking Popes
Sigur Rós
Spring Heeled Jack
Staind
Sugar Ray
Super Furry Animals
Son Volt
Soul Coughing
Systematic
Joe Strummer
Talib Kweli
Third Eye Blind
The Urge
Tugboat Annie
Walt Mink
Weezer
Scott Weiland 
Wilco

References

External links

 Article on Reverb from Billboard Magazine
Article on Reverb from Music Industry News Network

1990s American music television series
2000s American music television series
1997 American television series debuts
2001 American television series endings
HBO original programming
English-language television shows